This list of Black starting  NFL quarterbacks includes Black and African-American quarterbacks who have started in a regular-season or post-season game in the National Football League (NFL). The quarterback is the leader of a team's offense, directing other players on the field. Some authors have contended that Black players have been excluded from playing quarterback in the NFL because of the belief that white players would not follow their leadership and the perception that Black quarterbacks lack intelligence, dependability, composure, character, or charisma. Promising Black quarterbacks at the high school and college levels were often transitioned at the professional level to other positions, such as running back or wide receiver. While a ban on Black players in the NFL ended in 1946, the quarterback position was among the last to be desegregated.

Although Black quarterbacks and other quarterbacks of color vary in physical size and playing style, racial stereotyping persists. A 2015 study found that even when controlling for various factors, black quarterbacks are twice as likely to be "benched", or removed from play, as white quarterbacks. Other studies have found that sports broadcasters are more likely to attribute a Black quarterback's success to superior athletic attributes and a white quarterback's success to superior intellect. It was not until 2017, when the New York Giants started Geno Smith in place of the benched Eli Manning, that all 32 active NFL teams had started at least one Black quarterback. That year, nearly 70% of NFL players, but only 25% of starting quarterbacks, were black. 10 of the league's 32 starting quarterbacks were Black at the start of the 2020 NFL season, the most in a single week in NFL history.

Pre-Super Bowl era 

The quarterback position has changed over the years and did not exist in its modern form in the early 20th century. In the early days of football, quarterbacks were called upon to throw the ball, run the ball, and kick the ball; the forward pass was not adopted widely until the 1930s. However, tailbacks who played in the single-wing formation are "the equivalent of a modern-day quarterback" or "the closest thing to it."

Single-wing tailback Fritz Pollard, a key figure in the early days of the NFL, became the league's first black quarterback when he started playing the position for the Hammond Pros in 1923. By that time, he had already become the first Black head coach in the NFL, and prior to his professional career, the first Black quarterback All-American and the first to appear in the Rose Bowl. Pollard faced racism throughout his career, including from his teammates. In college, fans were reported to sing "Bye Bye Blackbird" when he took the field. Pollard would sometimes have to enter the field through a separate gate, or be driven onto the field in a car for his own safety, in order to avoid fans who chanted "kill the nigger" and threw bottles and bricks at him. After retiring from football, Pollard started the first black tabloid newspaper, the New York Independent News. In 2005, Pollard was inducted into the Pro Football Hall of Fame.

The demise of the competing American Football League (AFL) in the 1920s left a "glut of available white players eager to sign on with the NFL, rendering Black players expendable." In 1926 there were five Black players in the NFL, in 1927 only one. With the onset of the Great Depression in the 1930s, economic pressures led to a further deterioration of race relations, and minorities were often vilified and scapegoated. When the Chicago Cardinals signed Joe Lillard in 1932, the same year a rule change expanded the forward pass and Franklin Delano Roosevelt won the US presidency with 75% of the Black vote, he was the NFL's only Black player at the time. Lillard started 12 games with the Chicago Cardinals, and although he threw passes, ran the ball, kicked the ball, and returned punts, he was used sparingly as a quarterback.

1932 was also the year that segregationist George Preston Marshall founded the Boston Braves. The following year, Marshall renamed the Braves the Boston Redskins and brokered an NFL-wide ban on Black players. Joe Lillard was released, and by 1934, there were no Black players with NFL contracts. In 1937, Marshall moved the Redskins to the southern city of Washington D.C., which was still segregated, renaming the team the Washington Redskins. Marshall's so-called "gentlemen's agreement" barring Black players from the NFL lasted until after World War II, when the All-America Football Conference (AAFC) launched in 1946 as an unsegregated competing league. NFL owners relented and lifted the ban, although Marshall nevertheless refused to sign any black players to the Redskins until 1962, when he finally relented under threat from President John F. Kennedy to cancel the Redskins' 30-year stadium lease unless they integrated.

In 1949, George Taliaferro became the first black player drafted into the NFL. Taliaferro had previously played college football for the Indiana Hoosiers. He missed the 1946 season when he was conscripted into the US Army but returned to lead the Hoosiers in both rushing and passing in 1948. The NFL's Chicago Bears drafted Taliaferro in 1949, but he had already signed a contract with the Los Angeles Dons in the AAFC. The LA Dons later joined the NFL, and Taliaferro along with them. He played an unprecedented seven positions during his career, including single-wing tailback or quarterback, more than any player in NFL history. Taliaferro retired in 1955.

Two other Black quarterbacks made brief appearances in the pre-Super Bowl NFL. Willie Thrower, "the first Black NFL quarterback of the modern mold", played for Michigan State in college before playing one professional game at quarterback for the Bears, in relief duty, on October 18, 1953. Charlie Brackins, the NFL's first Black quarterback to have graduated from a historically Black college or university (HBCU), played one game as quarterback for the Green Bay Packers in 1955, missed both of his pass attempts, and was released by the team before the next game.

First by team (Super Bowl era) 

In 1967, the American Football League agreed to merge with the NFL, becoming the American Football Conference, with most former NFL teams forming the National Football Conference. Although the first championship game between the two conferences, known as the Super Bowl, was held in 1967, the merger was not completed until 1970. Marlin Briscoe played for the Denver Broncos, an AFL team, in 1968, and is considered the first black quarterback to start a game in the modern NFL. Briscoe started his rookie year as a defensive back, but when the starting quarterback was injured, Briscoe was called to fill in. He started the last five games of the season, during which he threw 14 touchdown passes and was a candidate for Rookie of the Year. Nevertheless, he was released after the season, and later converted to a receiver.

African-American quarterbacks named league MVP
Five times in NFL history the league MVP has gone to a black quarterback. Four different quarterbacks have the award, with Patrick Mahomes being the first two time winner.

5,000 yard passers

Playoff starters 
In 1974, James Harris became the first black quarterback to start and win an NFL playoff game. Midway through the 1976 season, Harris was benched by his team's owner, Carroll Rosenbloom, who explained his decision by telling the press, "Unfortunately, the quarterback position is controversial enough without adding the color element." After retiring, Harris became an executive for four teams and earned a Super Bowl ring in 2000 with the Baltimore Ravens.

Warren Moon, who made seven playoff appearances, was the first black quarterback elected to the Pro Football Hall of Fame. During his NFL career (1984–2000), he was the first black quarterback on four different teams.

The 2018–2019 playoffs featured five starting black quarterbacks, the most in NFL history.

Super Bowl starters 
In 1982, a players' strike cut the NFL season short to nine games. When a second strike occurred in 1987, the NFL, not wanting to lose games, hired replacement players. That year, black quarterbacks in the league tripled in number.

On September 20, 1987, Doug Williams became the first black quarterback to start a game for the Washington Redskins, the team that had been segregated for so long by its former owner, George Preston Marshall. Before starting for Washington, Williams had been drafted by the Tampa Bay Buccaneers and led them to three playoff appearances in three years. Williams joined the Redskins in the 1986 season, when he threw only one pass (incomplete). He played backup for most of the 1987 season, but outperformed the first-string quarterback, and was made starting quarterback for the playoffs. On January 31, 1988, he became the first black quarterback to start in the Super Bowl, and a few hours later, the first to win it, ironically wearing the Super Bowl ring of the last team in the league to integrate black players. Williams threw for 340 yards and four touchdowns–Super Bowl records at the time–and was named Super Bowl MVP. He was benched the next season and retired shortly thereafter.

Kansas City Chiefs quarterback Patrick Mahomes was the seventh black quarterback to start a Super Bowl. The combined Super Bowl records of black quarterbacks is 4–7. Williams and Mahomes are to date the only players to win the Super Bowl MVP award. Only Mahomes and Seattle Seahawks quarterback Russell Wilson have started multiple Super Bowls. Both players won their first Super Bowl appearance, but lost their second. In 2023, Mahomes became the first to start three Super Bowls. With the Chiefs' win, Mahomes became the first black quarterback to win two Super Bowls, as well as to win two MVP awards.

Super Bowl LVII also marked the first time that both Super Bowl starting quarterbacks were black: Patrick Mahomes started for the Kansas City Chiefs, while Jalen Hurts started for the Philadelphia Eagles. The Eagles are the first team to have two different black starting quarterbacks start a Super Bowl.

Gallery

Full list 

In 2000, Doug Williams, Warren Moon, Marlin Briscoe and James Harris formed the Field Generals, "a fraternity for black quarterbacks". Cam Newton, attended the Field Generals' training camp as a youth.

See also 

American football:
 List of African-American sports firsts
 History of African Americans in the Canadian Football League
 Black college football national championship
 Rooney Rule
 U.S. national anthem protests (2016–present)

Other sports:
 List of first black players for European national football teams (association football)
 Baseball color line
 List of first black MLB players
 Negro league baseball
 List of Negro league baseball players

 Black players in ice hockey
 Race and ethnicity in the NHL
 List of black NHL players
 Race and ethnicity in the NBA (basketball)
 Black participation in college basketball
 Rugby union and apartheid
 1968 Olympics Black Power salute

Notes

References 

Black quarterbacks
Quarterbacks
Quarterbacks
American football controversies
Sports culture
History of the National Football League
History of racial segregation in the United States
African-American sports history
Black quarterbacks
Black quarterbacks